Cheruputhoor or Cheruputhur is a village in Pulpatta Gram panchayat in Malappuram district, Kerala state.

Neighboring places

Educational institutions
 AMLP School, Cheruputhoor

Economy 
The economy encompasses traditional village farming, small scale businesses and foreign money. A good percentage of natives are working in the Middle East as unskilled workers. The local economy is currently undergoing a construction boom and which is solely dependent on the Gulf money.  The main crops that are cultivated are coconut, aracnut, paddy and banana.

Health care
The Government Homoeopathic Dispensary, Pulpatta is situated in Cheruputhoor. It was established in 1978.

See also
AMLP School Cheruputhur

References

Villages in Malappuram district